{{Infobox station
| name          = Gouda
| type          = 
| style         = NS
| image         = Gouda Hauptbahnhof 2.jpg
| image_caption = Gouda railway station
| address       = Gouda, South Holland, 
| coordinates   = 
| line          = Utrecht–Rotterdam railwayGouda–Den Haag railwayGouda–Alphen aan den Rijn railway
| other         = 
| structure     = 
| platform      = 6
| depth         = 
| levels        = 
| tracks        = 11
| parking       = 
| bicycle       = 
| baggage_check = 
| opened        = 21 May 1855
| closed        = 
| rebuilt       = 
| electrified   = 
| ADA           = 
| code          = 
| owned         = Nederlandse Spoorwegen
| zone          = 
| smartcardname = 
| smartcardstatus = 
| former        = 
| passengers    = 
| pass_year     = 
| pass_percent  = 
| pass_system   = 
| mpassengers   = 
| map_type = Netherlands Randstad ZW#Netherlands
| connections   =  Arriva: 1, 3, 4, 178, 187, 190, 196, 294, 726     Syntus Utrecht: 106, 107',
| services = 
}}Gouda' is a railway station in Gouda, Netherlands. The station opened on 21 May 1855 when the Nederlandsche Rhijnspoorweg-Maatschappij (Dutch Rijn Railway Company) opened the Utrecht–Rotterdam railway. The Gouda–Den Haag railway to The Hague was opened in 1870, and the connection to Alphen a/d Rijn in 1934.

Trains running between Den Haag Centraal / Rotterdam Centraal and Utrecht Centraal call at the station, as well as the RijnGouweLijn connection to Alphen a/d Rijn.

In November 1944, during World War II, the strategically located railway station was bombed by the Royal Air Force. The main building of the railway station was severely damaged; traces of the bombing are visible to this day on platforms 3 and 5. In 1948 a new building was constructed out of the remaining first floor of the old building. This was replaced by the current building in 1984.

Train services

The following train services call at Gouda:
1x per hour intercity service Rotterdam – Utrecht – Amersfoort – Zwolle – Groningen
1x per hour intercity service Rotterdam – Utrecht – Amersfoort – Zwolle – Leeuwarden
2x per hour intercity service Rotterdam – Utrecht
1x per hour intercity service The Hague – Utrecht – Amersfoort – Hengelo – Enschede
1x per hour intercity service The Hague – Utrecht – Amersfoort – Amersfoort Schothorst
2x per hour intercity service The Hague – Utrecht
2x per hour local service (sprinter) Rotterdam – Gouda – Gouda Goverwelle – Woerden – Amsterdam – Uitgeest
2x per hour local service (sprinter) Rotterdam – Gouda – Gouda Goverwelle (Peak hours only)
2x per hour local service (sprinter) The Hague – Gouda – Gouda Goverwelle – Utrecht
2x per hour local service (sprinter) The Hague – Gouda – Gouda Goverwelle (Weekdays only)
4x per hour local service (sprinter'') Gouda – Alphen aan den Rijn

Bus services

 1
 2
 3
 4
 106
 107
 175
 178
 190
 196
 278 (evening line 178)
 497
 726

External links
NS website
Dutch Public Transport journey planner

Railway stations in South Holland
Railway stations opened in 1855
Gouda, South Holland
1855 establishments in the Netherlands
Railway stations in the Netherlands opened in the 19th century